Hollar! is an album by jazz vocalist Etta Jones which was recorded at three separate sessions between 1960 and 1962 and released on the Prestige label in 1963.

Reception

The Allmusic site awarded the album 4 stars but stated: "Etta Jones had the spark that made each of her vocals special, though she was never acknowledged properly during a long career.... This is easily one of Etta Jones' best recordings."

Track listing 
 "And the Angels Sing" (Ziggy Elman, Johnny Mercer) – 2:37     
 "I Got It Bad (and That Ain't Good)" (Duke Ellington, Paul Francis Webster) – 4:11     
 "Give Me the Simple Life" (Rube Bloom, Harry Ruby) – 2:54     
 "The More I See You" (Mack Gordon, Harry Warren) – 4:13     
 "Love Is Here to Stay" (George Gershwin, Ira Gershwin) – 3:49     
 "Reverse the Charges" (Webster, Clarence Williams) – 2:59     
 "They Can't Take That Away from Me" (Gershwin, Gershwin) – 2:52     
 "Answer Me, My Love" (Fred Rauch, Carl Sigman, Gerhard Winkler) – 3:20     
 "Looking Back" (Brook Benton, Clyde Otis) – 3:44     
 "Nature Boy" (eden ahbez) – 2:55  
 Recorded at Van Gelder Studio in Englewood Cliffs, New Jersey, on September 16, 1960 (tracks 2, 4, 5 & 7), March 30, 1961 (tracks 1, 3, 6, 8 & 9) and November 28, 1962 (track 10).

Personnel 
 Etta Jones – vocals
 Oliver Nelson (tracks 4 & 5), Jerome Richardson (track 10) – tenor saxophone
 Lem Winchester – vibraphone (tracks 2, 4, 5 & 7)
 Kenny Burrell (track 10), Bucky Pizzarelli (track 10), Wally Richardson (tracks 1, 3, 6, 8 & 9) – guitar 
 Sam Bruno (track 10), Jimmy Neeley (tracks 1, 3, 6, 8 & 9), Richard Wyands (tracks 2, 4, 5 & 7) – piano
 George Duvivier (tracks 2, 4, 5 & 7), Michael Mulia (tracks 1, 3, 6, 8 & 9) – bass
 Bobby Donaldson (track 10), Roy Haynes (tracks 2, 4, 5 & 7), Rudy Lawless (tracks 1, 3, 6, 8 & 9) – drums

References 

Etta Jones albums
1962 albums
Prestige Records albums
Albums recorded at Van Gelder Studio
Albums produced by Esmond Edwards